Fábio Ronaldo da Costa Conceição (born 28 April 2001) is a Portuguese professional footballer who plays as a winger for Rio Ave.

Professional career
Fábio Ronaldo is a youth product of Leixões, Dragon Force, Porto, Palmeiras FC, Boavista, Sporting CP and Rio Ave. He began his senior career with the Rio Ave reserves in the 2020-21 season. He made his professional debut with Rio Ave in a 1–1 Liga Portugal 2 tie with Farense on 15 August 2021. He signed his first professional contract with Rio Ave on 26 August 2021, tying him to the club until 2026.

Honours
Rio Ave
Liga Portugal 2: 2021–22

References

External links
 

2001 births
Living people
Sportspeople from Vila Nova de Gaia
Portuguese footballers
Portuguese sportspeople of Cape Verdean descent
Rio Ave F.C. players
Primeira Liga players
Liga Portugal 2 players
Campeonato de Portugal (league) players
Association football wingers